Fra' Hugues Loubenx de Verdalle (13 April 1531 – 4 May 1595) was the 51st Grand Master of the Order of Malta, between 1582 and 1595.

History 
He is mainly remembered for the reconstruction of the hunting lodge at Boschetto which was renamed Verdala Palace in his honour. He is buried in a sarcophagus in the Crypt of the Co-Cathedral of St. John in Valletta. He was made Cardinal-Deacon of  S. Maria in Portico Octaviae by Pope Sixtus V in the consistory of December 18, 1587.

References

External links
 Coins of Grandmaster Hugues Loubenx de Verdalle

Grand Masters of the Knights Hospitaller
Knights of Malta
1531 births
1595 deaths
16th-century French cardinals
Burials at Saint John's Co-Cathedral